Crișcior is a commune in Hunedoara County, Transylvania, Romania. It is composed of four villages: Barza (Gurabárza), Crișcior, Valea Arsului (Vályaárszuluj) and Zdrapți (Zdrápc).

References

Communes in Hunedoara County
Localities in Transylvania